Sir Alan Sydenham Cooley,  (17 September 1920 – 13 April 1997) was a senior Australian Public Service official and policymaker.

Life and career
Alan Cooley was born in 1920.

He began his Commonwealth Public Service career in the Department of Supply, rising up the ranks to become Secretary of that department in 1966. He transferred the department headquarters to Canberra in January 1968.

Between 1971 and 1977, Cooley was Chairman of the Public Service Board. In 1977, he was appointed to be Secretary of the new Department of Productivity.

Awards
Cooley was made a Commander of the Order of the British Empire in January 1972. He was appointed a Knight Bachelor in June 1976.

In 2011, a street in the Canberra suburb of Casey was named Cooley Crescent in Alan Cooley's honour.

References

1920 births
1997 deaths
Australian public servants
Australian Commanders of the Order of the British Empire
Australian Knights Bachelor